Pedro Paulo Soares Pereira (born 22 April 1970, São Paulo, Brazil), better known by the artistic name Mano Brown, is a Brazilian rapper, music producer and founding member of the hip hop group Racionais MC's, along with  Ice Blue (Paulo Eduardo Salvador), Edi Rock (Edivaldo Pereira Alves) and KL Jay (Kleber Geraldo Lelis Simões).

In 2008, Rolling Stone chose the 100 greatest artists in Brazilian music; Mano Brown was 28th. His debut solo album Boogie Naipe was nominated for the 2017 Latin Grammy Award for Best Portuguese Language Contemporary Pop Album.

Discography

Racionais MC's 
 1990 - Holocausto Urbano
 1992 - Escolha o Seu Caminho
 1993 - Raio-X do Brasil
 1997 - Sobrevivendo no Inferno
 2001 - Racionais MC's Ao Vivo
 2002 - Nada como um Dia Após o Outro Dia
 2006 - 1000 Trutas, 1000 Tretas
 2014 - Cores e Valores

Solo 
 2016 - Boogie Naipe

See also 
 Torcida Jovem of Santos FC School of Samba

References 

Brazilian hip hop musicians
Musicians from São Paulo
1970 births
Living people
Brazilian rappers
Afro-Brazilian people